Eubothrium is a genus of flatworms belonging to the family Triaenophoridae.

The species of this genus are found in Europe and Northern America.

Species:
 Eubothrium acipenserinum (Cholodkovsky, 1918) Dogiel & Bychowsky, 1939 
 Eubothrium arcticum Nybelin, 1922

References

Platyhelminthes